Wauwatosa (YTB-775) was a United States Navy  named for Wauwatosa, Wisconsin. The tug was placed in service, but never commissioned.

Construction

The contract for Wauwatosa was awarded 31 January 1964. She was laid down on 21 August 1964 at Marinette, Wisconsin, by Marinette Marine and launched 19 May 1965.

Operational history
Placed in service in June 1966, Wauwatosa served with the Pacific Fleet at Yokosuka Naval Base, Japan and Subic Bay Naval Station.

Stricken from the Navy Directory 16 February 2002, she was scrapped 9 May 2005.

References

External links
 

Natick-class large harbor tugs
Ships built by Marinette Marine
1965 ships